I've Got Your Number or I Got Your Number may refer to:

I've Got Your Number (film), 1934 film
I've Got Your Number (novel), 2012 novel by Sophie Kinsella

Music
I've Got Your Number (album), a 1993 album by jazz saxophonist Tom Chapin
"I've Got Your Number" (Cheyne Coates song), 2004 dance song
"I've Got Your Number" (Cy Coleman song), song by Cy Coleman and others from the 1962 musical Little Me
 "I Got Your Number" (Deep Purple song), 2003 song by Deep Purple from the album Bananas
"I Got Your Number", 1995 song by  Deadstar
"I've Got Your Number", 2003 song by Elbow

See also
 "Got Your Number", 2008 song by Nadia Oh from the album Hot Like Wow
 We've Got Your Number, a BBC National Lottery game show in 1999